William was an Indian politician and former Member of the Legislative Assembly from Palliyadi. He was elected twice to Travancore-Cochin assembly and three times to Madras State assembly.

He was elected as a Member of Legislative assembly to Travancore-Cochin Legislative Assembly in 1952 election from Arumana constituency as a Tamil Nadu Congress candidate. He was elected again as a Tamil Nadu Congress candidate from Vilavancode constituency in 1954 election to Travancore-Cochin assembly. He was elected to Tamil Nadu legislative assembly in 1957 and 1962 elections from Vilavancode constituency. and from Killiyur constituency in 1967 election.

See also 
Vilavancode

References 

Travancore–Cochin MLAs 1952–1954
Travancore–Cochin MLAs 1954–1956
Madras MLAs 1952–1957
Madras MLAs 1957–1962
Madras MLAs 1962–1967
Possibly living people
Year of birth missing